Navdeep Amarjeet Saini (born 23 November 1992) is an Indian cricketer , born in Karnal, Haryana. He has played for Delhi since 2013. He made his international debut for the India cricket team in August 2019.

Early life
Navdeep Saini was born on 23 November 1992 in Karnal, Haryana. His father, a driver, was employed with the government of Haryana. His grandfather Karam Singh, an independence activist, was a part of Subhas Chandra Bose's Indian National Army.

Domestic career
Saini made his Twenty20 debut on 2 January 2016 in the 2015–16 Syed Mushtaq Ali Trophy.

In February 2017, he was bought by the Delhi Daredevils team for the 2017 Indian Premier League for 10 lakhs. In January 2018, he was bought by the Royal Challengers Bangalore in the 2018 IPL auction for 3 crores.

He was the leading wicket-taker for Delhi in the 2017–18 Ranji Trophy, with 34 dismissals in eight matches. He was also the leading wicket-taker for Delhi in the 2018–19 Vijay Hazare Trophy, with sixteen dismissals in eight matches. In October 2018, he was named in India C's squad for the 2018–19 Deodhar Trophy. The following month, he was named as one of eight players to watch ahead of the 2018–19 Ranji Trophy.

In February 2022, he was bought by the Rajasthan Royals in the 2022 Indian Premier League auction. In July 2022, he signed a short-term deal with Kent to play up to three County Championship and five One-Day Cup matches in England. He made his debut against Warwickshire and took seven wickets, including a five-wicket haul in the first innings.

International career
In June 2018, he was added to India's Test squad for their one-off match against Afghanistan as a replacement for Mohammed Shami, but he did not play. In April 2019, he was named as a standby bowler for the 2019 Cricket World Cup.

In July 2019, he was named in India's One Day International (ODI) and Twenty20 International (T20I) squads for their series against the West Indies. He made his T20I debut against the West Indies on 3 August 2019. He took three wickets from his four overs, including Nicholas Pooran and Shimron Hetmyer in two consecutive deliveries. He bowled a wicket-maiden in the last over of the innings, dismissing Kieron Pollard. He was named the man of the match. In December 2019, he was added to India's One Day International (ODI) squad for their home series against the West Indies. He made his ODI debut for India, also against the West Indies, on 22 December 2019. In February 2020, he was named in India's Test squad for their series against New Zealand. In October 2020, he was again named in India's Test squad, this time for their series against Australia. However, Saini could not play the whole tour due to a back spasm. He made his Test debut for India on 7 January 2021, against Australia, taking the wicket of fellow debutant Will Pucovski, as his maiden dismissal in Test cricket.

References

External links
 

1992 births
Living people
Indian cricketers
India Test cricketers
India One Day International cricketers
India Twenty20 International cricketers
Indian A cricketers
Delhi cricketers
India Green cricketers
Royal Challengers Bangalore cricketers
People from Karnal
Cricketers from Haryana
Rajasthan Royals cricketers
Kent cricketers